The Taekwondo competitions at the 2017 Southeast Asian Games in Kuala Lumpur took place at Kuala Lumpur Convention Centre.

Medalists

Poomsae

Kyorugi

Men

Women

Medal table

References

External links
  

2017 Southeast Asian Games events
2017
Southeast Asian Games